Below are the rosters for the 2003 South American Youth Championship tournament held in Uruguay. The ten national teams involved in the tournament were required to register a squad of 20 players; only players in these squads are eligible to take part in the tournament.

Players name marked in bold have been capped at full international level.

Argentina
Coach: Hugo Tocalli

Brazil
Coach: Marcos Paqueta

Chile
Coach: Cesar Vaccia 

(Source for player names:)

Ecuador
Coach: Fabián Burbano 

(Source for player names:)

Paraguay
Coach: Aníbal Ruiz

Uruguay
Coach: Jorge Orosmán da Silva 

(Source for player names:)

References

South American U-20 Championship squads